DO-212 is a performance standard published by RTCA, Incorporated. It contains Minimum Operational Performance Standards (MOPS) for aircraft equipment required for the Automatic Dependent Surveillance (ADS) function.  The supporting hardware can be a stand-alone ADS unit or alternatively, the ADS function may be installed within other on-board equipment.

Outline of contents
Purpose and Scope
Performance Requirements and Verification Procedures
Installed Equipment Performance
Terms and Acronyms
References
These references are noted in DO-212
ISO 7498  Information Processing Systems—Open Systems Interconnection—Basic Reference Model
ISO 8072  Information Processing Systems—Open Systems Interconnection—Transport Service definition
ISO 8073  Information Processing Systems—Open Systems Interconnection—Connection oriented transport protocol specification
ISO 8073 Addendum 4  Information Processing Systems—Open Systems Interconnection—Connection oriented transport protocol specification, Protocol enhancements
ISO 8473  Information Processing Systems—Data Communications—Protocol for providing the connectionless-mode network service
ISO 8348  Information Processing Systems—Data Communications—Network Services Definition
ISO 8348 Addendum 1  Information Processing Systems—Data Communications—Network Services Definition, Connectionless-mode transmission
DO-178B  Software Considerations in Airborne Systems and Equipment Certification
DO-205  Design Guidelines and Recommended Standards To Support Open Systems Interconnection for Aeronautical Mobile Communications.  Part 1—Internetworking
Appendix A: Suggested Timer Values

See also
Automatic Dependent Surveillance-Broadcast
Air traffic control
ACARS

RTCA standards
Avionics